Björlin is a surname. Notable people with the surname include:

Nadia Bjorlin (born 1980), American actress, singer and model
Risto Björlin (born 1944), Finnish sport wrestler
Ulf Björlin (1933–1993), Swedish composer and conductor

See also
Björling